Hoya lacunosa is a species of plant in the genus Hoya native to Southeast Asia. Its native range is Thailand through Borneo, Java, Sumatra, and the Philippines, and it is introduced in other countries as well. Like most Hoya, it is an epiphytic vining climber. It has smooth ovate to lanceolate leaves, and flowers that are scented like cinnamon.

References

lacunosa
Plants described in 1827